The tropical striped triplefin (Helcogramma striata), also called the striped threefin or neon triplefin, is a species of  triplefin blenny that is native to the central Indo-Pacific.

Description
The tropical striped triplefin is a small fish that can reach a maximum length of 4 cm.
The body is thin, more or less cylindrical section and relatively elongated, its mouth is terminal.

The ventral side of this fish is whitish. The rest of its body is red with white stripes running the length of its body and it has also white spots between the eyes.

The fins are translucent. its eyes are relatively large and the iris is orange.

Distribution & habitat
The tropical striped triplefin is widespread throughout the tropical and subtropical waters of the central Indo-Pacific, from the eastern coast of India, Sri Lanka included, to the Philippines and from south Japan to Solomon Islands.>

This triplefin occurs in clear waters with moderate current from the surface down to 30 meters depth. It is normally found perched on coral or other hard surfaces where it watches for drifting food.

Biology
The tropical striped triplefin lives in small group and feeds on zooplankton.

Conservation status
The species is targeted but not thought to be threatened by the aquarium trade. It is listed as Least Concern (LC) on the UICN.

References

External links
 
 

Tropical striped triplefin
Fish described in 1986